James Devlin may refer to:

Devlin (rapper) (born 1989), UK rapper
James Devlin (priest), American Jesuit priest
James Devlin (Oz), fictional character on the HBO drama Oz
Jim Devlin (1849–1883), American baseball player accused of throwing games
Jim Devlin (pitcher) (1866–1900), American baseball pitcher
Jim Devlin (catcher) (1922–2004), American baseball catcher
James Develin (born 1988), American football fullback